Ben Traoré (born 18 April 1986) is a Malian footballer. He last played for AC Kajaani in the Finnish third tier Kakkonen.

Traoré has previously played in the top divisions of Burkina Faso, Hungary, Libya and Finland. He has capped 8 times for the Mali national team.

References

External links

1986 births
Sportspeople from Bamako
Malian footballers
Malian expatriate footballers
Expatriate footballers in Burkina Faso
Expatriate footballers in Hungary
Expatriate footballers in Libya
Expatriate footballers in Finland
Malian expatriate sportspeople in Burkina Faso
Malian expatriate sportspeople in Hungary
Malian expatriate sportspeople in Libya
Malian expatriate sportspeople in Finland
Nemzeti Bajnokság I players
Veikkausliiga players
US des Forces Armées players
Győri ETO FC players
FC Haka players
Living people
Association football midfielders
Olympic Azzaweya SC players
AC Kajaani players
Libyan Premier League players
21st-century Malian people